Giulio Dressino (born 5 November 1992) is an Italian canoeist. He placed sixth in the K-2 1000 m and 14th in the K-4 1000 m events at the 2016 Summer Olympics.

References

External links

 

1992 births
Living people
Italian male canoeists
Olympic canoeists of Italy
Canoeists at the 2016 Summer Olympics
People from Gallarate
European Games competitors for Italy
Canoeists at the 2015 European Games
Canoeists at the 2019 European Games
Competitors at the 2018 Mediterranean Games
Mediterranean Games competitors for Italy
Sportspeople from the Province of Varese
21st-century Italian people